Harris is an unincorporated community in McCurtain County, Oklahoma, United States. A post office opened in Harris on May 22, 1894. The community was named for Choctaw jurist Henry C. Harris.

References

Unincorporated communities in McCurtain County, Oklahoma
Unincorporated communities in Oklahoma